Comparison of the nonsteroidal antiandrogen (NSAA) bicalutamide with other antiandrogens reveals differences between the medications in terms of efficacy, tolerability, safety, and other parameters. Relative to the other first-generation NSAAs, flutamide and nilutamide, bicalutamide shows improved potency, efficacy, tolerability, and safety, and has largely replaced these medications in clinical practice. Compared to the second-generation NSAAs, enzalutamide and apalutamide, bicalutamide has inferior potency and efficacy but similar tolerability and safety and a lower propensity for drug interactions.

Relative to steroidal antiandrogens like cyproterone acetate and spironolactone, bicalutamide has better selectivity in its action, superior efficacy as an antagonist of the androgen receptor, and better tolerability. Bicalutamide also shows a better safety profile than cyproterone acetate. When used as a high-dosage monotherapy, bicalutamide shows slightly inferior effectiveness in the treatment of prostate cancer compared to castration and GnRH analogues but a different and potentially superior tolerability and safety profile. Unlike antigonadotropic antiandrogens like cyproterone acetate and GnRH analogues, bicalutamide does not suppress production of testosterone or estradiol and instead actually increases it, which has an important involvement in the differential side-effect profiles of the medications.

Overview
Bicalutamide and the other nonsteroidal antiandrogens (NSAAs), since their introduction, have largely replaced cyproterone acetate (CPA), an older drug and steroidal antiandrogen (SAA), in the treatment of prostate cancer. Bicalutamide was the third  to be marketed, with flutamide and nilutamide preceding, and followed by enzalutamide. Relative to the earlier antiandrogens, bicalutamide has substantially reduced toxicity, and in contrast to them, is said to have an excellent and favorable safety profile. For these reasons, as well as superior potency, tolerability, and pharmacokinetics, bicalutamide is preferred and has largely replaced flutamide and nilutamide in clinical practice. In accordance, bicalutamide is the most widely used antiandrogen in the treatment of prostate cancer. Prior to the 2012 approval of enzalutamide, a newer and improved  with greater potency and efficacy, bicalutamide was regarded as the standard-of-care antiandrogen in the treatment of the prostate cancer.

First-generation 

Flutamide and nilutamide are first-generation , similarly to bicalutamide, and all three drugs possess the same core mechanism of action of being selective  antagonists. For these reasons, bicalutamide has largely replaced flutamide and nilutamide in clinical use, and is by far the most widely used first-generation .

Effectiveness
In addition, bicalutamide possesses the longest elimination half-life of the three drugs, with half-lives of 6–10 days for bicalutamide, 5–6 hours for flutamide and 8–9 hours for hydroxyflutamide, and 23–87 hours (mean 56 hours) for nilutamide. Due to the relatively short half-lives of flutamide and hydroxyflutamide, flutamide must be taken three times daily at 8-hour intervals, whereas bicalutamide and nilutamide may be taken once daily. For this reason, dosing of bicalutamide (and nilutamide) is more convenient than with flutamide. The greater  affinity and longer elimination half-life of bicalutamide allow it to be used at relatively low dosages in comparison to flutamide (750–1500 mg/day) and nilutamide (150–300 mg/day) in the treatment of prostate cancer.

While it has not been directly compared to nilutamide, the effectiveness of bicalutamide has been found to be at least equivalent to that of flutamide in the treatment of prostate cancer in a direct head-to-head comparison. Moreover, indications of superior efficacy, including significantly greater relative decreases and increases in levels of prostate-specific antigen (PSA) and testosterone, respectively, were observed.

Tolerability and safety

The core side effects of  such as gynecomastia, sexual dysfunction, and hot flashes occur at similar rates with the different drugs. Conversely, bicalutamide is associated with a significantly lower rate of diarrhea compared to flutamide. In fact, the incidence of diarrhea did not differ between the bicalutamide and placebo groups (6.3% vs. 6.4%, respectively) in the Early Prostate Cancer (EPC) clinical trial programme, whereas diarrhea occurs in up to 20% of patients treated with flutamide. The rate of nausea and vomiting appears to be lower with bicalutamide and flutamide than with nilutamide (approximately 30% incidence of nausea with nilutamide, usually rated as mild-to-moderate). In addition, bicalutamide (and flutamide) is not associated with alcohol intolerance, visual disturbances, or a high rate of interstitial pneumonitis. In terms of toxicity and rare reactions, as described above, bicalutamide appears to have the lowest relative risks of hepatotoxicity and interstitial pneumonitis, with respective incidences far below those of flutamide and nilutamide. In contrast to flutamide and nilutamide, no unique or specific complications have been linked to bicalutamide.

Second-generation 
Enzalutamide, along with the in-development apalutamide and darolutamide, are newer, second-generation . Similarly to bicalutamide and the other first-generation , they possess the same core mechanism of action of selective  antagonism but are thought to bind to the androgen receptor with higher affinity, prevent nuclear translocation and DNA binding, and induce apoptosis without agonist activity.  Theoretically such  increased affinity may make them more efficacious.  This is because cancer cells use different mechanisms to adapt and this increased affinity for the receptor make it more likely to bind to mutated receptors, to increased production of the receptors, and perhaps other mechanisms of resistance.

Effectiveness
In accordance, clinical findings suggest that enzalutamide is a significantly more potent and effective antiandrogen in comparison to first-generation NSAAs such as bicalutamide, flutamide, and nilutamide. Moreover, the medication has demonstrated greater clinical effectiveness in the treatment of prostate cancer in direct head-to-head comparisons with bicalutamide.

Tolerability and safety
In terms of tolerability, enzalutamide and bicalutamide appear comparable in most regards, with a similar moderate negative effect on sexual function and activity for instance. However, enzalutamide has a risk of seizures and other central side effects such as anxiety and insomnia related to off-target GABAA receptor inhibition that bicalutamide does not appear to have. On the other hand, unlike with all of the earlier  (flutamide, nilutamide, and bicalutamide), there has been no evidence of hepatotoxicity or elevated liver enzymes in association with enzalutamide treatment in clinical trials. In addition to differences in adverse effects, enzalutamide is a strong inducer of CYP3A4 and a moderate inducer of CYP2C9 and CYP2C19 and poses a high risk of major drug interactions (CYP3A4 alone being involved in the metabolism of approximately 50 to 60% of clinically important drugs), whereas drug interactions are few and minimal with bicalutamide.

Steroidal antiandrogens
 include cyproterone acetate (CPA), megestrol acetate, chlormadinone acetate, and spironolactone. In contrast to  however, they are non-selective, also binding to other steroid hormone receptors, and exhibit a variety of other activities including progestogenic, antigonadotropic, glucocorticoid, and/or antimineralocorticoid. However, some of them, namely  and spironolactone, are still commonly used in the management of certain androgen-dependent conditions (e.g., acne and hirsutism in women) and as the antiandrogen component of feminizing hormone therapy for transgender women.

Effectiveness
In a large-scale clinical trial that compared 750 mg/day flutamide and 250 mg/day  monotherapies in the treatment of men with prostate cancer, the two drugs were found to have equivalent effectiveness on all endpoints. This difference in effectiveness in men and women may be related to the fact that  like flutamide significantly increase androgen levels in men, which counteracts their antiandrogenic potency, but do not increase androgen levels in women.

Bicalutamide has been found to be at least as effective as or more effective than flutamide in the treatment of prostate cancer, and is considered to be the most potent and efficacious antiandrogen of the three first-generation . Accordingly, a study comparing the efficacy of 50 mg/day bicalutamide versus 300 mg/day  in preventing the  flare at the start of  agonist therapy in men with prostate cancer found that the two regimens were equivalently effective. There was evidence of a slight advantage in terms of speed of onset and magnitude for the  group, but the differences were small and did not reach statistical significance.

All medically used  are weak partial agonists of the  rather than silent antagonists, and for this reason, possess inherent androgenicity in addition to their predominantly antiandrogenic actions. In accordance, although  produces feminization of and ambiguous genitalia in male fetuses when administered to pregnant animals, it has been found to produce masculinization of the genitalia of female fetuses of pregnant animals. Also, there are two case reports of spironolactone actually accelerating progression of metastatic prostate cancer in castrated men treated with it for heart failure, and for this reason, spironolactone has been regarded as contraindicated in patients with prostate cancer.

Due to its progestogenic (and by extension antigonadotropic) activity,  is able to suppress circulating testosterone levels by 70 to 80% in men at high dosages.

Tolerability and safety
Due to the different hormonal activities of  like bicalutamide and  like , they possess different profiles of adverse effects.  is regarded as having an unfavorable side effect profile, and the tolerability of bicalutamide is considered to be superior. Due to its strong antigonadotropic effects and suppression of androgen and estrogen levels,  is associated with marked sexual dysfunction (including loss of libido and impotence) similar to that seen with castration, and osteoporosis, whereas such side effects occur minimally with  like bicalutamide. In addition,  has been associated with coagulation changes and thrombosis, fluid retention, cardiovascular side effects (e.g., ischemic cardiomyopathy), and adverse effects on serum lipid profiles, with severe cardiovascular complications occurring in approximately 10% of men with prostate cancer. In contrast, bicalutamide and other  are not associated with these adverse effects.

Due to increased estrogen levels, bicalutamide and other  are similarly associated with low rates of hot flashes (9.2% for bicalutamide vs. 5.4% for placebo in the  trial).

Unlike spironolactone, bicalutamide has no antimineralocorticoid activity, and for this reason, has no risk of hyperkalemia (which can, rarely/in severe cases, result in hospitalization or death) or other antimineralocorticoid side effects such as urinary frequency, dehydration, hypotension, hyponatremia, metabolic acidosis, or decreased renal function that may occur with spironolactone treatment. In women, unlike  and spironolactone, bicalutamide does not produce menstrual irregularity or amenorrhea, nor does it interfere with ovulation.

Castration and  analogues
Castration consists of either medical castration with a  analogue or surgical castration via orchiectomy.  analogues include  agonists like leuprorelin or goserelin and  antagonists like cetrorelix. They are powerful antigonadotropins and work by abolishing the -induced secretion of gonadotropins, in turn ceasing gonadal production of sex hormones. Medical and surgical castration achieve essentially the same effect, decreasing circulating testosterone levels by approximately 95%.

Effectiveness
Bicalutamide monotherapy has been reported to be roughly equivalent in effectiveness compared to  analogues and castration in the treatment of prostate cancer. A meta-analysis concluded that there is a slight effectiveness advantage for  analogues/castration, but the differences trended towards but did not reach statistical significance in that study. In , the median survival time was found to be only 6 weeks shorter with bicalutamide monotherapy in comparison to  analogue monotherapy. However, a 2015 Cochrane review reported lower overall survival times ( = 1.24), greater clinical progression ( = 1.14–1.26), and treatment failure ( = 1.14–1.27) with  monotherapy compared to monotherapy with a  agonist or surgical castration.

Tolerability and safety
Monotherapy with  including bicalutamide, flutamide, nilutamide, and enzalutamide shows a significantly lower risk of certain side effects, including hot flashes, depression, fatigue, loss of libido, and decreased sexual activity, relative to treatment with  analogues,  ( and  analogue combination), or surgical castration in prostate cancer. Another large study reported a rate of impotence of only 9.3% with bicalutamide relative to 6.5% for standard care (the controls), a rate of decreased libido of only 3.6% with bicalutamide relative to 1.2% for standard care, and a rate of 9.2% with bicalutamide for hot flashes relative to 5.4% for standard care. One other study reported decreased libido, impotence, and hot flashes in only 3.8%, 16.9%, and 3.1% of bicalutamide-treated patients, respectively, relative to 1.3%, 7.1%, and 3.6% for placebo.

A 2015 Cochrane review found that  monotherapy for prostate cancer had a greater risk of treatment discontinuation due to adverse effects than monotherapy with a  agonist or surgical castration ( = 1.82). This included a greatly increased risk of breast pain ( = 22.97) and gynecomastia ( = 8.43). The risk of other adverse effects, such as hot flashes ( = 0.23), was decreased with  monotherapy. The quality of the evidence was deemed moderate.

References

Bicalutamide